The  Green Bay Packers season was their 54th season overall and their 52nd season in the National Football League. The team finished with a 10–4 record under second-year head coach Dan Devine, earning them the NFC Central division title. The Packers returned to the playoffs after a four-year drought (and qualified for the first time since Vince Lombardi departed as head coach); their most recent division title was in 1967, completing that postseason with a decisive win in Super Bowl II in January 1968.

In 1972, Green Bay entered the penultimate regular season game at Minnesota on December 10 with an 8–4 record. The Vikings (7–5) had won the season's earlier game at Lambeau Field in Green Bay by breaking a fourth quarter tie with two interceptions for touchdowns. This time, the Packers overcame a 7–0 halftime deficit at Metropolitan Stadium with 23 unanswered points to clinch the division title. Running back John Brockington became the first in NFL history to rush for 1,000 yards in each of his first two seasons, and did it again the following season.

Placekicker Chester Marcol established an NFL rookie record for field goals in a season (since broken). It was the fifteenth and final season of hall of fame linebacker Ray Nitschke.

The Packers' next playoff appearance would come in 1982, and their next division title came 23 years later, in 1995.

Offseason 
In February , running back (and punter) Donny Anderson was traded to the St. Louis Cardinals for MacArthur Lane. Hall of Fame quarterback Bart Starr retired as a player in July; he was the quarterbacks coach and play caller in 1972. (He then pursued business interests and was a color analyst for CBS, then returned to the Packers as their head coach in the 1975 season.)

NFL draft 

 Yellow indicates a future Pro Bowl selection

Undrafted free agents

Roster

Regular season

Schedule 
In Week 3, the Packers defeated the defending Super Bowl champion Dallas Cowboys in Milwaukee, improving their all-time record to 7–1 over Dallas; the sole loss was in 1970.

Monday (October 16)
Note: Intra-division opponents are in bold text.

Playoffs 
Green Bay met the NFC East champion Washington Redskins (11–3) in the divisional playoffs on Christmas Eve at RFK Stadium. The Packers practiced the week before at Wake Forest University in Winston-Salem, North Carolina. The two teams had played four weeks earlier at the same venue; the Redskins won by five points on November 26, and were favored by in the playoff game by 4½ points. The results were similar, as Green Bay scored first but lost again in D.C., this time by thirteen points, 16–3.

Standings

Awards, records, and honors 
 Chester Marcol, NFL rookie record (since broken), most Field Goals in one year by a rookie, (32)
 Willie Buchanon – AP Defensive Rookie of the Year

References 

Sources
 Sportsencyclopedia.com

Green Bay Packers seasons
NFC Central championship seasons
Green Bay Packers
Green Bay Packers